Iván José Cano Blanco (born 7 May 1995) is a Spanish Paralympic athlete. He won the silver medal in the men's long jump T13 event at the 2020 Summer Paralympics held in Tokyo, Japan. He has also won medals in this event at the World Para Athletics Championships and the World Para Athletics European Championships.

References

External links
 

Living people
1995 births
Sportspeople from Alicante
Spanish male long jumpers
Medalists at the World Para Athletics Championships
Medalists at the World Para Athletics European Championships
Athletes (track and field) at the 2020 Summer Paralympics
Medalists at the 2020 Summer Paralympics
Paralympic athletes of Spain
Paralympic silver medalists for Spain
20th-century Spanish people
21st-century Spanish people